This page is a list of French divisions that existed during the First World War. Divisions were either infantry, colonial infantry or cavalry.

Infantry 

 1st Division
 2nd Division
 3rd Division
 4th Division
 5th Division
 6th Division
 7th Division
 8th Division
 9th Division
 10th Division
 11th Division
 12th Division
 13th Division
 14th Division
 15th Division
 16th Division
 17th Division
 18th Division
 19th Division
 20th Division
 21st Division
 22nd Division
 23rd Division
 24th Division
 25th Division
 26th Division
 27th Division
 28th Division
 29th Division
 30th Division
 31st Division
 32nd Division
 33rd Division
 34th Division
 35th Division
 36th Division
 37th Division
 38th Division
 39th Division
 41st Division
 42nd Division
 43rd Division
 44th Division
 45th Division
 46th Division
 47th Division
 48th Division
 51st Division
 52nd Division
 53rd Division
 55th Division
 56th Division
 57th Division
 58th Division
 60th Division
 61st Division
 62nd Division
 63rd Division
 64th Division
 65th Division
 66th Division
 67th Division
 68th Division
 69th Division
 70th Division
 71st Division
 72nd Division
 74th Division
 75th Division
 76th Division
 77th Division
 81st Territorial Division
 81st Division
 82nd Territorial Division
 83rd Territorial Division
 84th Territorial Division
 85th Territorial Division
 86th Territorial Division
 87th Territorial Division
 87th Division
 88th Territorial Division
 88th Division
 89th Territorial Division
 90th Territorial Division
 91st Territorial Division
 92nd Territorial Division
 94th Territorial Division
 96th Territorial Division
 97th Division
 97th Territorial Division
 99th Territorial Division
 100th Territorial Division
 101st Territorial Division
 102nd Territorial Division
103th Territorial Division
104th Territorial Division
105th Territorial Division
 120th Division
 121st Division
 122nd Division
 123rd Division
 125th Division
 126th Division
 127th Division
 128th Division
 129th Division
 130th Division
 132nd Division
 133rd Division
 152nd Division
 153rd Division
 156th Division
 157th Division
 158th Division
 164th Division
 165th Division
 166th Division
 169th Division
 170th Division

Cavalry 

 1st Cavalry Division
 1st Foot Cavalry Division
 2nd Cavalry Division
 2nd Foot Cavalry Division
 3rd Cavalry Division
 4th Cavalry Division
 5th Cavalry Division
 6th Cavalry Division
 7th Cavalry Division
 8th Cavalry Division
 9th Cavalry Division
 10th Cavalry Division

Colonial 

 Moroccan Division
2nd Moroccan Division
 2nd Colonial Infantry Division
 3rd Colonial Infantry Division
 10th Colonial Infantry Division
 11th Colonial Infantry Division
 15th Colonial Infantry Division
 16th Colonial Infantry Division
 17th Colonial Infantry Division

Bibliography

See also
 French Army order of battle (1914)
 Order of battle of the First Battle of the Marne
 First Battle of Ypres order of battle
 Order of battle for the Battle of the Somme
 List of forces involved in the Battle of Amiens
 List of French divisions in World War II

 
World War I
French, World War I